Arthur Quintal may refer to:

 Arthur Quintal I (1795–1873), Pitcairn Islander
 Arthur Quintal II (1816–1902), Magistrate of the Overseas British Territory of Pitcairn Island